Pusztavacs is a village in Dabas district, Pest county, Hungary, about 54 km south-east of the capital Budapest. Its population consists of 1530 inhabitants. Pusztavacs was first mentioned in records in 1274. It is notable for featuring the geographical centre of the country. To mark that centre, an 11 m high octagonal pyramid was built in 1978 by the plans of the architect József Kerényi.. The tower was burnt down in 2001 and later rebuilt in 2004.

Some sights include ruins of a 15th-century church and a memorial to the 13 martyrs of Arad.

Populated places in Pest County
Geographical centres